Seronga Airport  is an airport serving the village of Seronga in the North-West District of Botswana. The well-marked runway is on the northern edge of the Okavango Delta.

See also

Transport in Botswana
List of airports in Botswana

References

External links
OpenStreetMap - Seronga
Airport Nav Finder - Seronga

Airports in Botswana